Mumbai Indians (MI) are a franchise cricket team based in Mumbai, India, which plays in the Indian Premier League (IPL). Captained by Rohit Sharma, they were one of the eight teams that competed in the 2016 Indian Premier League.

Season standings

Match summary

Squad 
 Players with international caps before the start of 2016 IPL are listed in bold.

References

External links

2016 Indian Premier League
Mumbai Indians seasons